Callomyia is a genus of flies in the family Platypezidae. Some species can be found in Belgium.

Species
C. admirabilis Shatalkin, 1980
C. amoena Meigen, 1824
C. argentea Cumming, 2016
C. arnaudi Cumming, 2016
C. bertae Kessel, 1961
C. browni Cumming, 2016
C. calla Kessel, 1949
C. cleta Kessel, 1949
C. coei Kessel, 1966
C. corvina Kessel, 1949
C. dives Zetterstedt, 1838
C. dorsimaculata Shatalkin, 1982
C. elegans Meigen, 1804
C. fortunata Frey, 1936
C. gilloglyorum Kessel, 1961
C. krivosheinae Shatalkin, 1982
C. proxima Johnson, 1916
C. saibhira Chandler, 1976
C. sonora Shatalkin, 1993
C. speciosa Meigen, 1824
C. triangulata Tkoč, 2012
C. velutina Johnson, 1916
C. venusta Snow, 1894

References

External links

Platypezidae
Platypezoidea genera
Articles containing video clips